Tioga County may refer to:

Places
Two counties in the United States:
Tioga County, New York
Tioga County, Pennsylvania

Other
USS Tioga County (LST-1158), a United States Navy landing ship tank in commission from 1953 to 1970 which also saw non-commissioned service in the Military Sealift Command from 1972 to 1973 as USNS Tioga County (T-LST-1158)